Hamidiya (also Romanized as Ḩamīdīyā; also known as Shahr-e Ḩamīdīyā) is a city in the Central District of Yazd County, Yazd province, Iran. At the 2006 census, its population was 27,611 in 7,252 households. The following census in 2011 counted 37,428 people in 10,736 households. The latest census in 2016 showed a population of 51,793 people in 15,268 households.

References 

Yazd County

Cities in Yazd Province

Populated places in Yazd Province

Populated places in Yazd County